Alexandre José Maria dos Santos (18 March 1924 – 29 September 2021) was a Mozambican Roman Catholic cardinal. He was the first native cardinal of Mozambique.

Ecclesiastical career
Dos Santos was born in Zavala, Mozambique. He studied in Nyasaland and Lisbon before being ordained a Roman Catholic priest in 1953, becoming the first black Mozambican to receive the distinction. In 1973 he became the first African to run a seminary in Mozambique. He was archbishop of Maputo, between 1975 and 2003. On 26 June 1988, he was created a cardinal by Pope John Paul II, and given the titular church of San Frumenzio ai Prati Fiscali. He was instrumental in the peace process surrounding the end of the Mozambican Civil War. He did not participate in the conclaves of 2005 and 2013, because he was over the age limit by then.

References

External links
 
 Alexandre José Maria Cardinal dos Santos bio

1924 births
2021 deaths
Mozambican cardinals
20th-century Roman Catholic archbishops in Mozambique
21st-century Roman Catholic archbishops in Mozambique
Cardinals created by Pope John Paul II
Franciscan cardinals
People from Inhambane Province
Roman Catholic archbishops of Maputo